Drew Skundrich (born September 17, 1995) is an American professional soccer player who currently plays for Colorado Springs Switchbacks FC in the USL Championship.

Career

Youth and college 
Skundrich grew up in Pennsylvania, where he attended Hempfield High School. He played four years of college soccer at Stanford University between 2014 and 2017, where he made 82 appearances, scoring 9 goals and tallying 13 assists. He was captain his junior and senior year. During his senior season, Skundrich earned First Team All-Pac-12 honors as the team won its third-straight Pac-12 Championship. He was also a member of the league's second-team honors in 2016, while collecting conference All-Academic second team honors in 2015.

Skundrich also played with Premier Development League side Burlingame Dragons in 2016.

Professional 
On January 17, 2018, Skundrich was selected 40th overall in the 2018 MLS SuperDraft by LA Galaxy. However, he wasn't signed by the club.

On March 14, 2018 Skundrich signed with United Soccer League side Bethlehem Steel.
On December 10, 2018 Skundrich signed with United Soccer League side Sacramento Republic.

On February 8, 2021 Skundrich moved to Loudoun United for the 2021 season. On May 12, 2021, Skundrich moved to Loudoun's MLS parent club D.C. United. The next day he made his MLS debut in a 1–0 win against the Chicago Fire. Following the 2022 season, his contract option was declined by D.C. United.

On December 5, 2022, it was announced Skundrich would join USL Championship side Colorado Springs Switchbacks for their 2023 season.

Personal life
In December 2019, Skundrich married Andi Sullivan.

References

External links 

 
 

1995 births
Living people
American soccer players
Burlingame Dragons FC players
Philadelphia Union II players
Association football midfielders
USL League Two players
USL Championship players
LA Galaxy draft picks
Sacramento Republic FC players
Loudoun United FC players
D.C. United players
Colorado Springs Switchbacks FC players
Soccer players from Pennsylvania
Sportspeople from Lancaster, Pennsylvania
Stanford Cardinal men's soccer players
Major League Soccer players